Lawley Street railway station was opened in Birmingham, England on 10 February 1842, by the Birmingham and Derby Junction Railway.

The B&DJR had opened on 12 August 1839 with a line to Hampton, where it met the London and Birmingham Railway for passengers from Derby and the North East. Trains would reverse for Birmingham and travel into Curzon Street.

This gave problems from the start and, although it had been planned to run direct through a junction near Stechford, this was not proceeded with. Permission was sought for a new line, via the Tame valley, to a new station nearby.

In 1842, a new line was opened with a new terminus at Lawley Street. This proceeded from a junction at Whitacre with stations at Forge Mills (later renamed Coleshill), Water Orton and Castle Bromwich.

In 1851, the Midland Railway once more began to use Curzon Street with a new spur between Landor Street Junction and Derby Junction. Lawley Street then became a goods depot.

References

External links 

 Lawley Street Goods Station - On warwickshirerailways.com
 Visit to Lawley Street Goods Station - railaroundbirmingham.co.uk

Former Midland Railway stations
Railway stations in Great Britain opened in 1842
Railway stations in Great Britain closed in 1851
Disused railway stations in Birmingham, West Midlands